Mirjapur is a village development committee in Parsa District in the Narayani Zone of southern Nepal. At the time of the 2011 Nepal census, it had a population of 4,229 people living in 690 individual households. There were 2,189 males and 2,040 females at the time of the census. Mirjapur is the ward number 1 of the Chhipaharmai rural municipality.

References

Populated places in Parsa District